

The Ridgewood Incline was an inclined plane railroad in Allegheny City, Pennsylvania, in what is now the Perry South neighborhood of Pittsburgh. Built in 1886 and burned the next year, it was Allegheny's first and shortest-lived incline.

Description
The incline had a single track, with one car called to either end as wanted by an electric bell signal. Unlike most Pittsburgh-area inclines, it lacked a counterbalancing car and was thus not a funicular.

History
In the summer of 1886, a group of investors headed by real-estate broker Alexander Leggate formed the Ridgewood Incline Railway Company for the purpose of building and operating an "elevator incline railway". The work was carried out from the designs and under the superintendence of a local civil engineer named J.Ford Mackenzie. The railway opened to the public on 16 December 1886.

A fire on 30 May 1887, possibly from a natural gas leak, destroyed the engine house and office along with some 30 or 40 feet of track. The incline is not known to have been rebuilt. It appears on an 1890 map with the label "Old Incline Plane (Burned)", hundreds of feet south of the newer Clifton Incline.

See also 
 List of inclines in Pittsburgh

References

Inclined elevators
Railway inclines in Pittsburgh
Railway lines opened in 1886
1886 establishments in Pennsylvania
1887 disestablishments in Pennsylvania